Ilanga incisura is a species of small sea snail, a marine gastropod mollusk in the family Solariellidae.

Description
The height of the shell attains 6.3 mm, its diameter 10.9 mm.

Distribution
This marine species occurs in the Indian Ocean off the Saya de Malha Bank

References

External links
  "Novapex : trimestriel de la Société belge de malacologie"

incisura
Gastropods described in 1909